Patrik Klačan (born 10 November 1997) is a Slovak football player who plays as a right winger. He is currently playing for ŠK Selce.

Club career

FK Dukla Banská Bystrica
He made his professional debut for FC ViOn Zlaté Moravce against FK AS Trenčín on 1 August 2015.

References

External links
 
 Futbalnet profile
 Eurofotbal profile
 Patrik Klačan at Futbalnet

1997 births
Living people
Slovak footballers
Slovak expatriate footballers
Association football forwards
FK Dukla Banská Bystrica players
FC ViOn Zlaté Moravce players
Kapfenberger SV players
Slovak Super Liga players
2. Liga (Slovakia) players
Slovak expatriate sportspeople in Austria
Expatriate footballers in Austria